Jaakko Vähämaa (born 16 August 1993 in Lohja) is a Finnish professional squash player. As a junior, he won the Finnish Nationals 3 times in his age group. As of February 2018, he was ranked number 392 in the world. To date, his highest ranking has been number 132 in the world. He has reached the final rounds of many professional tournaments. He is in Finland men's national squash team and has represented his country internationally.

References

1993 births
Living people
Finnish male squash players
People from Lohja
Sportspeople from Uusimaa